Martensianthus is a genus of flowering plants belonging to the family Rubiaceae.

It is native to southern Mexico.

The genus name of Martensianthus is in honour of Martin Martens (1797–1863), a Belgian botanist and chemist born in Maastricht, Netherlands. 
It was first described and published in Acta Bot. Hung. Vol.53 on page 25 in 2011.

Known species
According to Kew:
Martensianthus breviflorus 
Martensianthus galeottii 
Martensianthus macdougallii 
Martensianthus micranthus 
Martensianthus viticellus

References

Rubiaceae
Rubiaceae genera
Plants described in 2011
Flora of Mexico